Sexcite! is the fourth studio album by Japanese band Beat Crusaders. It was released on October 9, 2002.

Track listing
 "Eyes in the Sky" - 3:54
 "Christine" - 1:16
 "Imagine?" - 3:13
 "Jubilation" - 2:09
 "Sad Song" - 1:59
 "Overture" - 2:29
 "Life in the Nation" - 2:21
 "Shadow Boxer" - 2:32
 "Saturday Goodbye" - 2:43
 "Sprite" - 2:15
 "Slah It Up" - 1:49
 "Cunt, Buy Me Love" - 2:37
 "Arakism" - 1:29

References

2002 albums
Beat Crusaders albums